God Father  is an Odia film and is the second venture of Chaturbhuja Films produced by Jugansu Sekhar Panda. The film is directed by National School of Drama trained Odia director Ramesh Rout. The music was composed by Abhijit Majumdar and the dialogue written by Dr. Nirmal Nayak. The film stars Siddhanta Mahapatra,This Movie is Siddhanta Mahapatra's Comeback as Leading Action Hero after joining Policitics in 2009 and Audiences And Critics Reviews are Positive for its Fresh Screenplay which was never seen before in Odia industry. It holds Highest grosser Odia Movie of 2017 & all time record till release of Daman . The Audio Music Released in Christmas 2016 and The music was released by Amara Muzik.Rakhi Sawant Done Cameo Number Which was Popular.

Plot 
The story revolves around the life of a man who becomes popular in his village by doing good work and working for the people while surrounded by some gangsters who try to ruin his works.

Cast
 Siddhanta Mahapatra
 Anu Choudhury
 Sashreek Samarth Mishra
 Ananya Mishra 
 Manisha Mishra 
 Daitari Panda
 Rakhi Sawant as item number "Chuti Kholile"
 Manoj Mishra

Soundtrack
The music was composed by Abhijit Majumdar and released by Amara Muzik.

References

External links 
 

2010s Odia-language films
Indian gangster films